East Mapleton is a community in the Canadian province of Nova Scotia, located in  Cumberland County. It was the birthplace of the Canadian writer Will R. Bird.

References
 East Mapleton on Destination Nova Scotia

Communities in Cumberland County, Nova Scotia
General Service Areas in Nova Scotia